In the United States, railroad carriers are designated as Class I, II, or III, according to annual revenue criteria originally set by the Surface Transportation Board in 1992.  With annual adjustments for inflation, the 2019 thresholds were US$504,803,294 for Class I carriers and US$40,384,263 for Class II carriers. (Smaller carriers were Class III by default.)

There are seven Class I freight railroad companies in the United States including two Canadian carriers with subsidiary trackage in the United States: BNSF Railway, Canadian National Railway (via its subsidiary Grand Trunk Corporation), Canadian Pacific Railway (via its subsidiary Soo Line Corporation), CSX Transportation, Kansas City Southern Railway, Norfolk Southern Railway, and Union Pacific Railroad. (Mexico's Ferromex and Kansas City Southern de México would qualify as Class I, but do not operate within the United States.)

In addition, the national passenger railroad in the United States, Amtrak, would qualify as Class I if it were a freight carrier, as would Canada's Via Rail passenger service if it operated within the United States.

Background
Initially (in 1911) the Interstate Commerce Commission (ICC) classified railroads by their annual gross revenue. Class I railroads had an annual operating revenue of at least $1 million, while Class III railroad incomes were under $100,000 per annum. All such corporations were subject to reporting requirements on a quarterly or annual schedule. If a railroad slipped below its class qualification threshold for a period, it was not necessarily demoted immediately. In 1925, the ICC reported 174 Class I railroads, 282 Class II railroads, and 348 Class III railroads.

The $1 million criterion established in 1911 for a Class I railroad was used until January 1, 1956, when the figure was increased to $3 million. In 1956, the ICC counted 113 Class I line-haul operating railroads (excluding "3 class I companies in systems") and 309 Class II railroads (excluding "3 class II companies in systems"). The Class III category was dropped in 1956 but reinstated in 1978. By 1963, the number of Class I railroads had dropped to 102; cutoffs were increased to $5 million by 1965, to $10 million in 1976 and to $50 million in 1978, at which point only 41 railroads qualified as Class I.

In a special move in 1979, all switching and terminal railroads were re-designated Class III — even those with Class I or Class II revenues.

In early 1991, two Class II railroads, Montana Rail Link and Wisconsin Central, asked the Interstate Commerce Commission (ICC) to increase the minimum annual operating revenue criteria (then established at US$93.5 million) to avoid being redesignated as Class I, which would have resulted in increased administrative and legal costs. The Class II maximum criterion was increased in 1992 to $250 million annually, which resulted in the Florida East Coast Railway having its status changed to Class II. 

The thresholds set in 1992 were:
Class I: A carrier earning revenue greater than $250 million
Class II: A carrier earning revenue between $20 million and $250 million
Class III: A carrier earning revenue less than $20 million

Since dissolution of the ICC in 1996, the Surface Transportation Board (STB) has become responsible for defining criteria for each railroad class. The STB continues to use designations of Class II and Class III since there are different labor regulations for the two classes. The bounds are typically redefined every several years to adjust for inflation and other factors.

Class II and Class III designations are now rarely used outside the rail transport industry. The Association of American Railroads typically divides non–Class I companies into three categories:
Regional railroads: operate at least  or make at least $40 million per year.
Local railroads: smaller than a regional railroad, but engage in line-haul service.
Switching and terminal railroads: mainly switch cars between other railroads and/or provide service in a common terminal.

Classes 
In the United States, the Surface Transportation Board categorizes rail carriers into Class I, Class II, and Class III based on carrier's annual revenues. The thresholds, last adjusted for inflation in 2019 are:
Class I: A carrier earning revenue greater than $504,803,294
Class II: A carrier earning revenue between $40,387,772 and $504,803,294
Class III: A carrier earning revenue less than $40,387,772
In Canada, a Class I rail carrier is defined as a company that has earned gross revenues exceeding $250 million (CAD) for each of the previous two years.

Class I

Class I railroads are the largest rail carriers in the United States.

BNSF Railway and Union Pacific Railroad have a duopoly over all transcontinental freight rail lines in the Western United States, while CSX Transportation and Norfolk Southern Railway operate most of the trackage in the Eastern United States, with the Mississippi River being the rough dividing line. Canadian National Railway (via its subsidiary Grand Trunk Corporation) and Kansas City Southern Railway operate north-south lines near the Mississippi River. Canadian Pacific Railway (via its subsidiary Soo Line Corporation) has a comparatively small footprint in the Upper Midwest and Northeastern United States. 

In addition, the national passenger railroads in the US and Canada —Amtrak and Via Rail— would both qualify as Class I if they were freight carriers. Similarly, Mexico's Ferromex would qualify as a Class I railroad if it had trackage in the United States.

Class II

A Class II railroad in the United States hauls freight and is mid-sized in terms of operating revenue. Switching and terminal railroads are excluded from Class II status.

Railroads considered by the Association of American Railroads as "Regional Railroads" are typically Class II. An example of a Class II would be the Florida East Coast Railway.

Class III

Class III railroads are typically local short-line railroads serving a small number of towns and industries or hauling cars for one or more railroads; often they once had been branch lines of larger railroads or even abandoned portions of main lines. Some Class III railroads are owned by railroad holding companies such as Genesee & Wyoming or Watco.

See also

 List of U.S. Class I railroads
 List of U.S. Class II railroads
 Rail transport in Canada
 Rail transport in Mexico
 Rail transport in the United States
 Timeline of Class I railroads: 1910–1929, 1930–1976, 1977–present

References

Citations

Sources 

 Surface Transportation Board FAQs – Economic and Industry Information
 STB Ex Parte No. 647

External links
 List and Family Trees of North American Railroads
 Uniform Classification of Accounts and Related Railway Records (UCA); retrieved April 24, 2005.
Surface Transportation Board FAQs – Economic and Industry Information

 
Former Class I railroads in the United States
Rail transportation in the United States
Rail transport classification systems